Leeman is a former settlement in Yolo County, California. It lay at an elevation of 23 feet (7 m). It last appeared on maps as of 1916.

References

External links

Former settlements in Yolo County, California
Former populated places in California